Hightogy, also known as Ridge Beat or Simmon Town, is an unincorporated community in Lamar County, Alabama, United States.

History
The community's name is possibly a compound word derived from high and the Middle English word tor, which means "high, craggy hill". A post office operated under the name Hightogy from 1890 to 1909.

References 

Unincorporated communities in Lamar County, Alabama
Unincorporated communities in Alabama